The women's 3000 metres at the 2018 IAAF World U20 Championships was held at Ratina Stadium on 11 July.

Records

Results

References

3000 metres
Long distance running at the World Athletics U20 Championships